The 10 kilomètres de Port-Gentil (also known as the 10KM POG) is an annual road-based 10K run hosted by Port-Gentil, Gabon, since 2017.  The race is a World Athletics Elite Label Road Race.  During the race weekend, a competitive 3K race is also offered for runners between the ages of 12 and 15.

History 

A total of 5,446 people participated in the event, which was won by Kenyan runners Alex Korio and Ruth Chepng'etich, with finish times of 27:48 and 31:36, respectively. Chepng'etich's performance was an African 10K all-comers record.

In 2019, Kenyan runner Sheila Chelangat set a new African 10K all-comers record with a finish time of 30:55, beating Chepng'etich's 2017 record by 41 seconds.

The 2020 edition of the race was postponed due to the coronavirus pandemic.

Course 

The race is a clockwise loop that begins and ends on boulevard Léon Mba in front of the Foire Municipale.  Runners first head north from the start before running south along the coast on boulevard du Gouverneur Chavannes during the race's first half.  During the last few kilometres, the course eventually heads back up north via avenue de la Balise before turning onto boulevard Léon Mba for the finish.

Winners 

Key: Course record (in bold)

Notes

References

External links 
 Official website

2017 establishments in Gabon
10K runs
Annual sporting events in Gabon
June sporting events
Port-Gentil
Recurring sporting events established in 2017
Road running competitions in Gabon